Belengi (also Romanized as Belengī; also known as Bīlīngī) is a village in Pir Sohrab Rural District, in the Central District of Chabahar County, Sistan and Baluchestan Province, Iran. According to the 2006 census, its population was 333, divided across 64 families.

References 

Populated places in Chabahar County